KTVK (channel 3) is an independent television station in Phoenix, Arizona, United States. It is owned by Gray Television alongside CBS affiliate KPHO-TV (channel 5) and low-power station KPHE-LD (channel 44), a grouping known as "Arizona's Family". KTVK and KPHO-TV share studios on North Seventh Avenue in Uptown Phoenix; KTVK's transmitter is located on South Mountain on the city's south side. The station's signal is relayed across northern Arizona on a network of translator stations.

Prior to being an independent station, KTVK was Phoenix's ABC affiliate for nearly 40 years, losing its affiliation as part of a shuffle of networks in 1994 and 1995. It was one of the last family-owned major-market TV stations, being owned in part or whole by the McFarland and Lewis families from its inception until 1999.

History

Early years
Channel 3 was the last commercial VHF allocation in Phoenix to be awarded. Prior to the 1948 freeze on new TV applications, there had been one application made, from radio station KTAR, one of the state's largest. In February 1953, however, after the freeze was lifted, a second applicant filed for the channel: the Arizona Television Company. That put the plans of KTAR—which already had television equipment on order—on hold. Originally owned by Buckeye rancher and car dealer Ralph Watkins as well as two other principals, a new stockholder was added to the company in May: former senator Ernest McFarland, who bought a 40 percent interest. Also seeking channel 3 was Herb Askins, a local businessman, but his Desert Advertising Co. dropped out late in the year, setting up a high-stakes showdown between Phoenix's NBC radio affiliate and the McFarland group in hearings in February 1954.

The staring contest, however, ended two months later. In late April, KTAR announced that it would purchase Mesa-based NBC affiliate KTYL-TV channel 12, for $250,000, a move that effectively awarded the channel 3 allocation to the Arizona Television Company. Within weeks, a Federal Communications Commission hearing examiner recommended the company be granted a construction permit, which took place on June 11.

The transmitter was built at South Mountain, and a $500,000 studio building was constructed at 16th Street and Osborn Road. The station affiliated with ABC, filling a void that would have been created when existing ABC outlet KOOL-TV announced plans to change to CBS. By the time the station signed on February 28, 1955, McFarland had been elected Governor of Arizona. Channel 3 boasted the first color-equipped studios in Phoenix and the largest in the state.

Channel 3 lost money in its early years, competing against three local stations that had long-respected radio sisters on which to draw revenue. According to a 1990 interview, in the early 1960s, Walter Cronkite sought to buy a stake in the Arizona Television Company. He would have become KTVK's main anchor, with a salary of $25,000 a year. However, Arizona Television Company could not afford to meet Cronkite's salary demands.

Delbert W. Lewis, McFarland's son-in-law, was named president of KTVK in 1975 and general manager in 1980. McFarland bought out the other partners in the Arizona Television Company in 1977.

The rise
In March 1984, Delbert Lewis and his wife Jewell McFarland Lewis were named the conservators of McFarland's estate, just three months before the former governor died; as a result, the Lewises inherited full control of KTVK. Two years later, Lewis would make the two most consequential hirings in station history, poaching a dozen employees from KTSP-TV, including station manager Bill Miller and news director Phil Alvidrez. At the time, KTVK had spent the better part of its history in third place. In January 1985, Arizona Republic television columnist Bud Wilkinson referred to the station as a "blot on [ABC]'s affiliate ledger" and claimed, citing a conversation with a top network executive, that the network had occasionally tried to move to another station and still was interested in the idea. As late as 1989, ABC executives were in negotiations to move from KTVK to KTSP-TV.

Under Miller and Alvidrez, the station relaunched its news department—considered by the mid-1980s as "a joke" in the industry—as "NewsChannel 3" and began a climb to the top of the ratings. The station dismissed its existing weeknight news anchor team and rolled out a new lineup, led by new hire Cameron Harper and former weekend anchor Heidi Foglesong. Lewis bankrolled major investments in people, syndicated programming and equipment and dramatically boosted KTVK's promotional budget. Improvement started slowly but was noticeable by 1988. By late 1990, the station had taken the lead at 10 pm, and its early evening newscasts were posting the strongest numbers in their history; a year later, it had tied longtime leader KTSP-TV in those time slots.

The growth of the company fueled additional media acquisitions. In the span of a year, the Arizona Television Company bought Phoenix Magazine and radio station KESZ (99.9 FM), as well as a production studio. Reorganizing as Media America Corp. (and later MAC America Communications), the group also handled programming responsibilities for the new KTWC (103.5 FM) when it signed on in 1994.

Going independent

On May 23, 1994, New World Communications and Fox announced a pact that would see KSAZ-TV leave its longtime affiliation with CBS to join Fox. The landmark deal also left CBS looking for new television stations in several other markets, including Detroit, Cleveland and Tampa, and set off a mad dash to secure network affiliations. The dealmaking environment favored station groups with presences in multiple cities, not KTVK—one of the last family-owned major-market stations in the country.

In this environment, Scripps-Howard Broadcasting, owner of displaced Fox affiliate KNXV-TV, found itself in a prime position. Scripps owned two successful ABC affiliates in Detroit and in Cleveland, and CBS was heavily wooing both stations to join its network. KTVK was already in talks for a new affiliation agreement with ABC, more than doubling its hourly compensation rate—but still less than the network was offering to stations much smaller than channel 3. However, the offer was then taken off the table by the network at the advice of its lawyers; a call with ABC network president Bob Iger revealed that Scripps-Howard—a longtime partner of the network—had told ABC that they were threatening to flip the Detroit and Cleveland ABC affiliates to CBS unless they secured the ABC affiliation for KNXV-TV in Phoenix. Iger wanted to keep KTVK, but Tom Murphy, the CEO of Capital Cities/ABC, felt that he had to be able to offer the ABC affiliation in Phoenix to Scripps if necessary to avoid potential long-term damage to the ABC television network.

Scripps-Howard refused to budge from demanding the ABC affiliation for Phoenix. It even refused $25 million from the network to "take Phoenix off the table". Ultimately, ABC gave in and awarded the ABC affiliations in Phoenix, Tampa and Baltimore to Scripps; in informing KTVK, Iger explained that they "had to" do so. The Lewises then sought to affiliate with CBS, which was about to be displaced from KSAZ. However, despite Tom Murphy's support, CBS ultimately chose a deal with group owner Meredith Corporation and its KPHO-TV.

Over the second half of 1994, KTVK relinquished ABC programming to KNXV in stages.  Good Morning America was the first ABC program to move to KNXV after KTVK displaced it with a new local morning newscast. KNXV then picked up World News Tonight and Nightline on December 12, the day after Fox programming moved to KSAZ. The rest of ABC's programming moved to KNXV on January 9, 1995.

Despite the loss of ABC programming, the Lewises and station management committed to build KTVK into one of the nation's top independents. The station spent some $100 million on new syndicated programming, including Mad About You and Frasier, as well as poaching the most popular shows in syndication at the time from KSAZ-TV—game shows Wheel of Fortune and Jeopardy!—and programming them in the prime time hour between 7 and 8 p.m. KTVK also broke ground on a new studio center to house its growing operations. The news department was expanded with 20 new staffers. Media America struck a local marketing agreement to operate the new KASW (channel 61) with The WB—which would air on KTVK until KASW launched in September 1995—and children's programming, and it launched the AZ News Channel, a cable offering on Cox Communications systems featuring breaking news and replays of KTVK newscasts that had been in the planning stages since 1993. Another large acquisition came in the form of sports rights to the expansion Arizona Diamondbacks baseball team, with channel 3 airing half of the team's games beginning in the 1998 season. The station remained Phoenix's news leader in most time slots, with the exception of 10 pm, when strong NBC programming gave KPNX the lead.

In the fall of 1998, KTVK briefly aired The Howard Stern Radio Show; both KTVK (which aired the program after its 10 p.m. news) and Lubbock, Texas, Fox affiliate KJTV-TV pulled the program from their schedules after two episodes.

Belo ownership

In what Del Lewis described as "the most difficult decision our family has ever made", MAC America sold KTVK and its other remaining assets to the Belo Corporation of Dallas, Texas, for $315 million in July 1999. The Lewises cited the costs of conversion to digital television, economies of scale that station groups had in purchasing syndicated programming, and competition from cable and satellite TV in their decision to sell; the transaction capped two years of selling the rest of the company, including Phoenix Magazine, the production facility, and the radio stations, which had suffered from the needed investments in programming and news expansion at KTVK. Later that year, Belo announced that it would purchase KASW from Gregory Brooks, forming the first television duopoly in the Phoenix market just as they were being legalized. Bill Miller retired a year later.

In 2000, Belo and Cox expanded their existing partnership with a new Spanish-language channel, ¡Más! Arizona, that launched on October 16 of that year. KTVK lost the Diamondbacks after the 2007 season, when the team opted to move all of its regional telecasts to cable on regional sports network Fox Sports Arizona.

Helicopter crash

On July 27, 2007, KTVK's news helicopter "News Chopper 3" was involved in a mid-air collision when another news helicopter, belonging to KNXV-TV, struck it from behind. The collision occurred above Steele Indian School Park (near Third Street and Indian School Road), while both aircraft were covering a police pursuit in downtown Phoenix. All four people aboard both helicopters were killed, including KTVK pilot Scott Bowerbank and photographer Jim Cox. An investigation conducted by the Federal Aviation Administration (FAA) and National Transportation Safety Board (NTSB) determined that the accident was caused by both pilots' inability to see one another and avoid a collision with the other helicopter.

The helicopter collision resulted in the establishment of shared news helicopters in the Phoenix market; while KTVK initially shared a helicopter with KPHO-TV and KPNX, all four Phoenix news operations now share a single helicopter.

Sale to Meredith
On June 13, 2013, the Gannett Company, the owner of KPNX and the Arizona Republic, acquired Belo. As FCC rules restrict one company from owning more than two television stations in the same market, Gannett announced that it would spin off KTVK and KASW to Sander Media, LLC, a company operated by former Belo executive Jack Sander. While Gannett intended to provide services to the stations through a shared services agreement, KTVK and KASW's operations would have remained largely separate from KPNX and the Republic. Despite objections to the Gannett-Belo merger by anti-consolidation groups (such as Free Press) and pay television providers (due to ownership conflicts involving television stations and newspapers both companies owned in other markets, the use of Sander as a third-party licensee to buy stations that would be operated by the owner of a same-market competitor, concerns over any future operational consolidation of the stations involved in the deal, and the Gannett and Sander stations colluding in retransmission consent negotiations), the FCC granted approval of the deal on December 20.

As the sale was completed on December 23, 2013, Sander/Gannett then sold KTVK to the Meredith Corporation, owner of CBS affiliate KPHO-TV. The license assets of KASW were sold to SagamoreHill Broadcasting, with Meredith to operate that station through a shared services agreement. However, as a voluntary condition of the transaction's approval, that station was instead sold off to the Nexstar Broadcasting Group. The sale was approved on June 16, 2014, and completed on June 19. On August 7, 2014, Meredith bought the KTVK studios, with the intent of housing the combined operation at KTVK's larger and newer facility.

The union of KTVK and KPHO-TV's news operations, marketed under the "Arizona's Family" banner long associated with KTVK, came with the loss of 14 jobs across both stations. KPHO general manager Ed Munson headed the combined operation until his 2018 retirement.

Sale to Gray Television
On May 3, 2021, Gray Television announced its intent to purchase the Meredith Local Media division, including KTVK and KPHO, for $2.7 billion. In Arizona, Gray owned KOLD-TV in Tucson. The sale was completed on December 1.

Local programming

Newscasts

KTVK had traditionally been the third-rated local station for news and had "long been viewed as a loser", with stints as "Total News" and later "Eyewitness News"; while the station briefly had momentum under Cecil Tuck in the early 1980s, it was unable to escape the ratings basement. The station frequently attempted to lure personalities from competing stations, with mixed results: Mary Jo West, the first female anchor in Phoenix at KOOL/KTSP, returned from a job at CBS News in 1983, but channel 3 was unsuccessful in hiring anchors from KPNX. West left in the summer of 1986.

The station managed to shed its third-place positioning and become the market leader after the hiring of Miller and Alvidrez in 1986. However, the loss of ABC affiliation led to major changes for KTVK's news department. Chief among them was the launch of a three-hour morning newscast, Good Morning Arizona, initially hosted by Jodi Applegate, who would leave KTVK to host the weekend editions of The Today Show in 1996. By that time, Good Morning Arizona had beaten out all of its local and national competitors in the ratings. The station also transformed its 5 and 6 p.m. newscasts into the 90-minute Good Evening Arizona, and when KASW launched in 1995, KTVK produced a 9 p.m. newscast for the new station.

KTVK itself, however, was later to prime time news than many independent stations. In 1996, it instead relaunched its 10 p.m. newscast as "Tonight Arizona", which later became "NewShow" and "The News Show". This changed in 2008, when the station replaced 8 p.m. and 10 p.m. broadcasts with a 9 p.m. newscast and expanded Good Morning Arizona, bringing it to 52 hours a week of newscasts; a 10 p.m. broadcast was later reinstated in 2011.

KTVK was also involved with news production and simulcasts for the Tucson market when Belo owned and operated KMSB, Tucson's Fox affiliate. In 2003, KMSB began a 9 p.m. newscast, which originally was produced in Phoenix and used news reporting from KMSB-employed reporters and from Tucson NBC affiliate KVOA. Additionally, from 2003 to 2012, KMSB simulcast Good Morning Arizona.

Non-news
KTVK also airs a limited amount of non-news local programming. One of the station's offerings, the local pet program Pets on Parade, is the longest-running local TV show in Arizona, having first been broadcast in December 1958. In 2010, the station launched the weekly political program Politics Unplugged.

Gray announced in January 2023 that it would launch the Arizona's Family Sports and Entertainment Network (AZFSEN) over KPHE-LD on March 1, 2023, and that it had acquired the rights to Phoenix Rising FC soccer; KPHE will air all 34 matches, with five simulcasts on KTVK and one on KPHO-TV.

Notable former on-air staff
 Wally Bruner, former newscaster in the 1960s
 Jineane Ford, former reporter, later of KPNX 
 Tony Kovaleski, former reporter, later of KNXV
 Samantha Mohr, former meteorologist, later of The Weather Channel
 Christi Paul, former anchor and consumer reporter, left in 2003 to work for CNN; currently a weekday news anchor at HLN and weekend anchor for CNN's New Day
 Brandon Lee Rudat, anchor
 Lauren Sánchez, former anchor and reporter
 Ray Scott, 5 pm sportscaster and television play-by-play voice of ASU football in the 1980s

Technical information

Subchannels
The station's digital signal is multiplexed:

On October 20, 2009, KTVK added This TV to its 3.2 digital subchannel. This TV was dropped on April 13, 2015, and replaced with a 24/7 loop of local news—the former Arizona NewsChannel. On the same day, sister station KPHO's former 24/7 weather service, moved to KTVK's 3.3 digital subchannel. It was dropped from KPHO in favor of Cozi TV. On August 1, 2017, the local news loop on 3.2 was replaced by the sci-fi network Comet.

KTVK joined the Phoenix ATSC 3.0 lineup on July 8, 2021, on the KFPH-CD multiplex. On that date, as part of rebalancing of its subchannels, the KASW subchannel of Ion Mystery was moved to the KTVK multiplex.

Analog-to-digital conversion
KTVK shut down its analog signal, over VHF channel 3, on June 12, 2009, the official date in which full-power television stations in the United States transitioned from analog to digital broadcasts under federal mandate. The station's digital signal continued to broadcast on its pre-transition UHF channel 24, using virtual channel 3.

As part of the SAFER Act, KTVK kept its analog signal on the air to inform viewers of the digital television transition through a loop of public service announcements from the National Association of Broadcasters. KTVK's "nightlight" service was originally intended to last 30 days, but was instead discontinued two weeks after the analog-to-digital transition on June 26.

Translators
KTVK is rebroadcast on the following translator stations:

 Bullhead City (Katherine Landing): K12OF-D 
 Bullhead City (Oatman/Goldroad Crest): K16EV-D
 Camp Verde, etc.: K32ME-D
 Cottonwood: K28OA-D 
 Flagstaff: K25MG-D 
 Globe–Miami: K14NA-D 
 Kingman: K23FV-D
 Lake Havasu City: K29FD-D
 Meadview (Patterson Slope): K25DH-D
 Prescott: K11LC-D
 Williams–Ash Fork: K15HY-D

See also
 List of news aircraft crashes

References

External links
 
 The McFarland Collection – KTVK-TV (Photo gallery maintained by Pinal County, Arizona)

Independent television stations in the United States
TVK
Comet (TV network) affiliates
Television channels and stations established in 1955
Gray Television
1955 establishments in Arizona
Former Meredith Corporation subsidiaries